Galeria Echo is a shopping centre in Kielce in Southern Poland. The centre was developed by the Echo Investment.

Cinema

Buildings and structures in Kielce
Shopping malls established in 2002
Shopping malls in Poland
Tourist attractions in Świętokrzyskie Voivodeship
2002 establishments in Poland